Sunswept is a 1962 British naturist film directed by Edward Craven Walker.

References

External links

British drama films
Nudity in film
1960s English-language films